Collins Lake is a lake in the U.S. state of Wisconsin.

Collins Lake was named in the 1950s after W. F. Collins, a county boardmember.

References

Lakes of Wisconsin
Bodies of water of Portage County, Wisconsin